Timur Khamitgatin (born 27 April 1993) is a Kazakhstani biathlete. He competed in the 2018 Winter Olympics.

References

1993 births
Living people
Biathletes at the 2018 Winter Olympics
Kazakhstani male biathletes
Olympic biathletes of Kazakhstan
Competitors at the 2015 Winter Universiade
21st-century Kazakhstani people